Lake Chambers Speed (born on January 17, 1948) is an American retired stock car racing driver. He formerly competed in the NASCAR Winston Cup Series, scoring one career win in 402 starts.

Background
Lake was named after the best friend of his father, Bob Lake. Lake's father, Leland S. Speed, took office as the Mayor of Jackson, Mississippi, in 1948, the same year that Lake was born. He started his racing career at the age of thirteen racing karts, much to the displeasure of his family. Over the years, Speed won the International Karting Federation (IKF) National Championship six times and in 1978 he won the prestigious Karting World Championship over, among others, future three-time Formula One champion Ayrton Senna. Speed had been the only American to win the World Karting Championship until 2015 when 14 year-old Logan Sargeant of Florida won the KFJ World Karting Championship on September 27, 2015.

NASCAR career

1980–1984
In 1980 after considering racing in other series such as Formula One, CART, and IMSA, and getting advice from current Charlotte Motor Speedway promoter, Humpy Wheeler, Speed chose to go NASCAR racing. According to Speed, "It was the highest mountain to climb." Speed's relative unfamiliarity with the NASCAR scene led him to buy his first car from someone in Chicago. Speed started 19 races in his rookie year scoring an eighth at Darlington Speedway in his third career start. Speed also scored finishes of seventh at the spring Talladega Superspeedway race, eighth at Talladega's fall event, seventh at Charlotte's fall event and eighth at the season ending race at Ontario Motor Speedway. Speed finished 22nd in overall points and second to Jody Ridley in the rookie of the year standings.

In 1981, Speed again ran his own operation starting 27 of the 31 races on the schedule.  Lake was unable to qualify for the 1981 Daytona 500, but did manage to win the 30-lap consolation race, leading the race from start to finish. He scored a ninth-place finish in both races at Rockingham and at Bristol. He followed that up with a seventh in Martinsville Speedway's spring event, an eighth at the now-defunct Texas World Speedway and a sixth in the late summer Talladega event. Speed's final top ten would come at Bristol in August where he finished seventh. The final points tally came up with Speed finishing 18th in points.  One special footnote for Speed during the '81 season was that he enabled future NASCAR pace car driver Elmo Langley to start his 536th and final NASCAR race at Dover in the Mason-Dixon 500.  Langley started 29th and finished 29th completing only six laps before a driveshaft failure.

1982 was Speed's first full year of competition on the Winston Cup circuit. This time, Speed was driving for the first time for another car owner, Roger Hamby. The beginning of the season was a struggle with Speed not obtaining a top ten finish until the 11th race, at Dover International Speedway. In July at Daytona, Speed scored his second top ten finish with a ninth. Speed continued to struggle as the season wrapped up managing to finish sixth in the Southern 500 at Darlington and eighth at the fall event at the North Wilkesboro Speedway. Speed finished 20th in points.

1983 was a year of major change for Speed. He was now driving for an established owner in Hoss Ellington, however on a limited schedule. The team showed promise early in the season scoring a fourth at Rockingham and a sixth at Darlington. It was at Talladega where Speed's life took a major change. Towards the race's end, Speed was leading the field with a chance to win his first Cup race. He was beaten at the end by Richard Petty and Benny Parsons. After the race, Speed decided to change his life and become a devout Christian. The week after Talladega, Speed scored another top ten with a sixth in the World 600 at Charlotte. Speed's final top ten of the season was the August Michigan International Speedway race with an eighth-place finish. Speed finished 27th in the points standings.

1984 was much the same. Starting 19 of the series' 30 races, Speed showed some early season strength with a third at Rockingham, a ninth at Atlanta and a sixth at Charlotte. At the first Pocono Raceway race, Speed qualified second and finished tenth following that up with a fifth at Michigan. Speed finished eighth in the late summer Talladega race and had a near win in the Southern 500 starting second and leading 28 laps before he crashed out. Speed's final top ten was at Atlanta with a seventh-place finish and 26th in points.

Speed also started six races in the NASCAR Busch Series between 1983 and 1984. He only made one start in 1983, at Charlotte in the Miller Time 300, where he finished sixth. In 1984, Speed lost by two feet to Darrell Waltrip in the season opening Goody's 300 at Daytona, and scored another top five in the Mello Yello 300 at Charlotte. Speed's worst qualifying effort was a 13th place start in the season opener. Speed's starts were fifth at Darlington, seventh at Charlotte, third at Darlington and ninth at Charlotte.

1985–1989
1985 was Speed's breakout season in NASCAR. Running a full schedule under the RahMoc Racing banner, Speed started off the season with a second-place finish to Bill Elliott in the Daytona 500. CBS's pit reporter Mike Joy conducted an interview with Speed after the race, during which the emotional driver repeatedly thanked God for the successful showing.  He followed that up with a tenth at Richmond International Raceway and a fourth at Rockingham, taking the points lead early in the season. After an engine problem at Atlanta, Speed scored a string of strong runs: seventh at Bristol, ninth at Darlington, ninth at North Wilkesboro, eighth at Martinsville and tenth at Talladega. Speed then finished sixth in the World 600. The stretch run of the season took its toll on the team and Speed's position in the points fell; however, he continued to post strong runs, finishing seventh at Talladega, tenth at Bristol, tenth at Dover and seventh and ninth-place finishes at Atlanta and Riverside International Raceway to round out the season. Overall, it was Speed's best year in terms of points, notching a tenth-place finish.

Speed started off the 1986 season with a tenth in the Daytona 500 and a tenth at Rockingham but after the fourth race of the season, he was ousted from the ride. Speed started one more race that season, filling in for the ailing Rick Wilson in his Morgan-McClure Motorsports ride at Charlotte finishing fourteenth. Shortly thereafter, Speed began working again at starting his own race team.

1987 was a building year in many ways. With sponsorship from Wynn's Car Care products, Kmart and Delco Battery, Speed built an entirely new race team with himself as the owner, and veteran crew chief Darrell Bryant helping him to build the operation.  The purple and white Oldsmobile donned the number 83, in honor of the year Lake became a born-again Christian.  In his thirteen starts Speed finished ninth in the first Talladega race and followed that up with a third-place finish in the World 600. Speed's other two top ten finishes were at the same tracks, seventh place at both Talladega and Charlotte.

The team's strong 1987 performances continued in 1988. With strong support from the Hoosier tire company, Speed ran strong in the Daytona 500 before dropping out due to an engine failure. The next race, at Richmond, Speed ran up front leading sixty-seven laps but finished sixth. The following race, at Rockingham, Speed again showed power, leading fifty-one laps and finishing second to Neil Bonnett. Speed's first win came March 27 at Darlington in the TranSouth 500. After starting the race eighth, Speed methodically moved his way to the front before eventually taking the lead and running away from the field. Leading 178 of the 367 laps, Speed beat Alan Kulwicki by half a straightaway to secure his first and only NASCAR Winston Cup win.  One of the factors in Speed's victory was that he was the only driver who tested the Hoosier tires at Darlington.  Where most of his competitors thought that the Hoosiers would blister, Lake and his team believed that they would not.

At Dover, Speed finished fourth, following that up with finishes of ninth at Daytona and fifth at Michigan.  In the Volunteer 500, Speed led sixty-six laps and looked like a strong contender for the race win before blowing a right front tire and hitting the wall, effectively ending his day. Speed's last top ten came at the 1988 Delaware 500 with a ninth-place effort. The season ended with Speed seventeenth place in the final points rundown.

Speed had strong finishes in 1989 with a Bull's Eye Barbecue Sauce sponsorship Speed said was "worth peanuts."  At Rockingham Lake took eighth and a few weeks later he finished tenth Darlington. Speed finished fifth in the inaugural event at Sears Point (now Sonoma) Raceway and a seventh a few races later at Michigan. However, in the July race at Pocono, Speed was injured in a two-car wreck that also injured driver Greg Sacks. Although Sacks' car overturned, Speed was injured more severely, and missed several races. This crash was featured in a 1990 video titled "Champions of the Checkered Flag".  While Lake recovered from his injuries, he had several drivers drive in his place including Joe Ruttman at Talladega, Michigan and Bristol; Eddie Bierschwale at Watkins Glen; and Rodney Combs at Darlington.  Lake returned to action in the Miller High Life 400 at Richmond to finish 14th.  At the final race of the '89 season at Atlanta, Lake was able to conclude a personally disappointing year with a 10th-place run.

1990–1994
In 1990, Speed started only six races with Prestone sponsorship, finishing two of them.  The best finish of Lake's abbreviated 1990 season came at Talladega's Die Hard 500 with an eleventh-place effort.  Speed also fielded cars for short track ace Tommy Ellis and Phil Parsons in two races.  Ellis started the Delaware 500 at Dover in 31st and finished 32nd after an engine failure.  In the National 500 at Charlotte, Parsons drove Speed's car with Baja Boats sponsorship to an 18th-place run. 1991 was an improvement in terms of races started.  Speed replaced Dick Trickle in Cale Yarborough's car but struggled with mechanical failures throughout his stint with the team. In twenty starts, Speed's best finish was an eleventh at Bristol in August. In 1992, Speed got back to his own team starting just nine races with Purex as his sponsor. The team suffered several mechanical failures and Speed only managed to have a best finish of eighteenth in the final two races of the season at Phoenix and Atlanta.

After driving his own car during a handful of races in the 1993 season's first half, Speed was called to drive for Robert Yates Racing, filling in following Davey Allison's death. Speed qualified fourth at Watkins Glen International. He followed that up with a second place start at Michigan and a seventh-place finish. The next race at Bristol, Speed was running a strong race before contact late with Rick Mast ruined his chances at a top ten finish. After Bristol, Speed was replaced by Ernie Irvan, but less than a week later, on September 3, it was announced that Speed would drive the #15 Ford owned by Bud Moore for 1994, replacing Geoff Bodine, who would depart from Moore's Ford to drive his own team which he purchased following Alan Kulwicki's death. However, two races later at Dover, Speed replaced Bodine in Moore's #15, as Ford allowed Bodine to take over Kulwicki's former #7 for the last seven races of 1993, in preparation for his first full season as an owner-driver. Speed's best finish for Moore at the end of the '93 season was an eleventh at Charlotte.

Speed remained with Moore for the 1994 season starting off with finishes of sixth at Atlanta, fifth at Darlington and third at Bristol, moving up to fifth place in the points. Two races later, Speed finished seventh at Talladega. It was during this time that Speed was inducted into the karting hall of fame. Speed would have to wait until the July Daytona race to get another top ten finish, a tenth. Speed and the team ran good through the summer stretch, often starting near the rear of the field but moving to the front. Unfortunately, Speed did not manage a top ten finish until Dover where he finished ninth. In the final four races, Speed had three great runs. A fifth at Charlotte, a tenth at Rockingham and a fourth at Atlanta where he led twenty laps. It wasn't enough for Speed to finish in the top ten in points. He finished eleventh behind Bill Elliott.

1995–1998
Speed moved over to Melling Racing team for the 1995 season and resurrected the organization.  The normally red and white Melling car now was emblazoned with Spam sponsorship and blue and yellow colors. Speed had two top ten runs, at Charlotte in the Coca-Cola 600 and at Darlington in the Southern 500 to finish twenty-third in the points rundown. However, the 1995 season provided Speed with what is perhaps his most famous moment. After the Miller Genuine Draft 400, Michael Waltrip blocked Speed's car in the pits. Waltrip, angry with Speed for blocking him on the track, pulled down Speed's window net and began throwing punches at Speed, who was wearing his helmet. The incident was broadcast in front of a live television audience on the CBS network and resulted in a $10,000 fine for Waltrip.

During the 1996 season, Speed earned his first career NASCAR pole, albeit in a non-points event, the Winston Open.  At the Miller 400 at Michigan, the normally blue and yellow Spam Ford was graced in red, white and gold in honor of 50 years of Melling's parts company being in operation.  Speed and the Melling Racing team notched an eighth place finish at Pocono in the Miller 500.  Speed stunned everyone in qualifying for the Brickyard 400 at Indianapolis with a third-place effort.  During the race, Speed made a daring three-wide pass to take the lead.  The finishing order saw Speed finish 13th after leading two laps.  At the second race in Michigan, the GM Goodwrench Dealer 400, Speed led seven laps and looked poised to possibly capture his second NASCAR Winston Cup victory before getting caught up in a wreck started by Sterling Marlin.  Though Speed qualified poorly for the Southern 500, he quickly moved his way through the field.  Just as he neared running in the top ten, a right front tire cut and Lake had to pit under the green flag, losing two laps.  However, the strength of the car would prove itself as Speed worked his way back to finish 10th, the final top ten finish of his career.

After the University of Nebraska backed out of their sponsorship, Speed and Melling ran a limited 1997 season.  Speed qualified for all 25 races he attempted.  Lake and the team raced to a solid 12th-place finish in the Pontiac Excitement 400 at Richmond, then followed that up with a sixth-place qualifying effort at Atlanta.  During the midpoint of the season, the No. 9 car was filmed for the TV movie Steel Chariots.  In the Miller 400 at Michigan, Speed earned his and the team's best finish of the season, an 11th.  A few races later, Speed finished 12th in the Brickyard 400.  At Richmond in the Exide NASCAR Select Batteries 400, Speed seemed to have one of the stronger cars, leading three laps through a series of green flag pit stops.  However, during the stop, the crew bolted the left side tires on the right side and the right side tires on the left, forcing Speed to make multiple pit stops and dropping him out of a chance of having a good finish. A few races later, Lake had a 14th-place run at Martinsville in the Hanes 500.  The Melling team was able to get sponsorship for the last four races of the season from Advantage Camo, their best finish being 17th at Rockingham's AC Delco 400.  Speed finished 35th in the points standings.

1998 was Speed's final Winston Cup season. Having secured sponsorship from the Cartoon Network, Speed's best finish of the season was in the Daytona 500 where he tangled with John Andretti with two laps to go bringing out the yellow flag that effectively won the race for Dale Earnhardt.  The 1998 season proved to be a challenge for Lake and the Melling Racing team.  It appeared as if the team was struggling with the new Ford Taurus bodies, and that translated to some poor results. At Sears Point Raceway, Speed appeared to have a chance to turn his season around.  He was strong during the first practice session with the second fastest speed behind Jeff Gordon. In the second practice session, Speed ran over debris thrown on the track by a car that had gotten off course, cut a tire and slammed into one of the tire barriers breaking his sternum. Speed missed the event and was replaced by Butch Gilliland, but he returned to the next race at New Hampshire. However Speed was caught up in a wreck not of his own making and aggravated his injury. After the race, Speed felt it best for the team to find another driver. Speed stepped aside and was replaced by Jerry Nadeau.  With Speed's age being against him and a push for younger drivers, he effectively retired from NASCAR racing.  Though Speed  only made 16 starts during the 1998 season, he still finished 43rd in the points standings.

After retirement 

In 2006, the International Kart Federation established the Lake Speed Achievement of Excellence karting award in honor of the 1978 World Karting Champion. The award was presented for the first time at the IKF 2-Cycle Sprint Grand Nationals August 3–6 at Fontana, California. The inaugural recipient was Matt Johnson of Las Vegas, Nevada.  Nick Johnston of Northridge, California was awarded the honor in 2007.  The award went to Taylor Miinch in 2008 and Mike Botelho Jr in 2009.  And youngest winner of the award went to Ryan Schartau of Chino, California in 2013. The recipient of the award could be a driver, team, kart shop or any combination thereof, and the winner is determined primarily on sportsmanship, driving achievement and professionalism during the race event.

On occasion, Speed still drives karts, and has four wins in Historic Stock Car Racing Association events on Daytona's 3.56-mile road course in 2002 and 2003 driving one of his old 83 Purex-sponsored Ford vehicles.

Speed currently races in the World Karting Association National Road Racing Series schedule, in the Spec 125 TaG 1 and 2 classes.
On July 30, 2010 Speed was inducted into the Mississippi Sports Hall of Fame.
Speed has since 2016 been an avid follower of the RHPK kart series.

Motorsports career results

NASCAR
(key) (Bold – Pole position awarded by qualifying time. Italics – Pole position earned by points standings or practice time. * – Most laps led.)

Winston Cup Series

Daytona 500

Busch Series

References

External links
 
 Drivers statistics for rare/little known races
 May 10, 2007 NASCAR.com article, "Where is... Lake Speed?"

Living people
1948 births
Sportspeople from Jackson, Mississippi
Racing drivers from Mississippi
NASCAR drivers
Karting World Championship drivers
American Christians
International Kart Federation drivers
Robert Yates Racing drivers